Sehnsucht is a German noun translated as "longing", "yearning", or "craving".

Sehnsucht may also refer to:

In film:
 Sehnsucht (1921 film) or Desire, a lost film by F. W. Murnau
 Sehnsucht (2006 film), a German film by Valeska Grisebach, for which she was named Best Female Director at the Copenhagen International Film Festival 

In music:
 Sehnsucht (Lacrimosa album), 2009
 Sehnsucht (Rammstein album), or the title song, 1997
 Sehnsucht (Schiller album), or the title song, 2008
 "Sehnsucht" (Jimmy Makulis song), 1961
 "Sehnsucht", a song by Ellen Allien from Berlinette
 "Sehnsucht", a song by Einstürzende Neubauten from Kollaps
 Sehnsucht (band), a band featuring former Mayhem frontman Sven Erik Kristiansen
 "Sehnsucht nach dem Frühlinge" a German song by  Christian Adolph Overbeck and Wolfgang Amadeus Mozart

lv:Sehnsucht